Matrilineal succession is a form of  hereditary succession or other inheritance through which the subject's female relatives are traced back in a matrilineal line.

Systems
matrilineal primogeniture where the eldest female child of the subject is entitled to the hereditary succession before her younger sisters, and her brothers are not entitled at all.
matrilineal ultimogeniture where the youngest daughter is the heir. This system is found among the Khasis of India.
rotation among female relatives.
matrilineal seniority, where the eldest sister is succeeded by her next eldest sister, etc., until the surviving sisters have had their turns, at which point the females of the next generation, daughters of these "original" sisters will have their turns, in order of seniority.

Other examples
One of early dynasties of China had similar practices. History postulates that there, a father-in-law was typically succeeded by his son-in-law. However, this again is obviously not a female succeeding a female, but a form of succession by appointment: the monarch chose his successor, and formalized that appointment by marrying the chosen man with a royal daughter, which also worked as a way to legitimize the succession.

Matrilineal succession in Africa
The order of succession to the position of the Rain Queen is an example in an African culture of matrilineal primogeniture: not only is dynastic descent reckoned through the female line, but only females are eligible to inherit.

Matrilineal succession in Asia and America
The matrilineal succession is prevalent among many sects in Asia. These include the Minangkabau culture of West Sumatra, Marumakkathayam or Aliyasantana system among Nairs and Tuluva's  of India. The Undangs of Negeri Sembilan, Malaysia exhibit matrilineal succession in their elective  chieftaincies.  
Similar traditions exist among the Khasi and Garo of Meghalaya, India, the Nakhi of China, the Gitksan of British Columbia, the Iroquois Confederacy (Haudenosaunee), the Hopi, the Berbers.

Consequences
In societies using matrilineal descent, the social relationship between children and their biological father tends to be different because he is not a member of their matrilineal family. For example, the man who would have the formal responsibilities that Western cultures assign to a father would be a boy's mother's brother, since he is the closest elder male kinsman.

Similarly, inheritance patterns for men in matrilineal societies often reflect the importance of the mother's brother. For example, in the Ashanti Kingdom of Central Ghana, a king traditionally passes his title and status on to his sister's son. A king's own biological son does not inherit the kingship because he is not a member of the ruling matrilineal family group. Women usually inherit status and property directly from their mothers in matrilineal societies.

References

Inheritance
Monarchy
Order of succession